The 1990 West Coast Conference men's basketball tournament was held March 3 and 4 at the Gersten Pavilion at Loyola Marymount University in Los Angeles, California. This was the fourth edition of the tournament.

During the first semi-final game on Sunday between top-seeded Loyola Marymount and #4 seed , LMU forward  collapsed with 13:34 left in the first half. He had just scored a dunk on an alley-oop pass from point guard  that put the Lions up  He fell a short distance from Pilots point guard , attempted to get up, but shortly after stopped breathing. Transferred to nearby Daniel Freeman Marina Hospital, Gathers was pronounced dead less than two hours later; he was 

Seeded eleventh in the West regional, the Lions won three games and advanced to the  they lost to top seed  the eventual national champion.

Bracket

References

West Coast Conference men's basketball tournament
Tournament
West Coast Athletic Conference men's basketball tournament
West Coast Athletic Conference men's basketball tournament
Cancelled basketball competitions